In South America, Argentina and Chile use  track gauge, as well as  or metre gauge.

Exceptions are the Estrada de Ferro do Amapá north of the Amazon River, which has  gauge, and the Lines 4 and 5 of São Paulo Metro, which also use standard gauge.

Argentina (partly), Venezuela, Paraguay, Uruguay, and Peru use standard gauge.  In the past a few lines in Northern Chile also had standard gauge, as the only international railway between Arica (Chile) and Tacna (Peru), slightly more than 60 km, uses standard gauge.  The El Cerrejón Coal Railway in Colombia is also .

There are and were also some lines using different narrow gauges; see the "narrow gauge" section in this list.

See also 

 Rail gauge in Europe
 Rail gauge in North America

References

Rail transport in South America